The 1991–92 Austrian Hockey League season was the 62nd season of the Austrian Hockey League, the top level of ice hockey in Austria. Seven teams participated in the league, and EC VSV won the championship.

Regular season

Playoffs

Semifinals

Final

External links
Austrian Ice Hockey Association

Austrian Hockey League seasons
Aus
1991–92 in Austrian ice hockey leagues